The 1961–62 season was Newport County's fourth consecutive season in the Football League Third Division since the end of regionalisation in 1958. It was their 33rd season in the third tier and 34th competitive season overall in the Football League.

Season review

Results summary

Results by round

Fixtures and results

Third Division

FA Cup

Football League Cup

Welsh Cup

League table

External links
 Newport County 1961-1962 : Results
 Newport County football club match record: 1962
 Welsh Cup 1961/62

References

 Amber in the Blood: A History of Newport County. 

1961-62
English football clubs 1961–62 season
1961–62 in Welsh football